The Columbia Lions women's squash team is the intercollegiate women's squash team for Columbia University located in New York City, New York. The team competes in the Ivy League under the aegis of the College Squash Association. The team is coached by Jacques Swanepoel, Joanne Schickerling and Chris Sachvie.

Annual results 
Updated December 2019.

Players

2019-2020 Roster 

Updated December 2019.

Notable Squash Alumnae 
 Tanvi Khanna: Class of 2018, 3x Second Team All-American, 3x First Team All-Ivy, #94 PSA world ranking as of October 2019
 Colette Sultana: Class of 2017, Second Team All-American #121 PSA world ranking as of August 2020

References

External links 
 

 
College women's squash teams in the United States
Squash in New York (state)
Sports clubs established in 2010
2010 establishments in New York City